Jennifer Gilbert (born February 3, 1992) is a Canadian softball player.

Career
Gilbert competed at the 2019 Pan American Games in Lima, winning silver. 

In June 2021, Gilbert was named to Canada's 2020 Olympic team.

References

External links
 Ball State Cardinals bio

1992 births
Canadian softball players
Living people
Sportspeople from Saskatoon
Softball players at the 2019 Pan American Games
Medalists at the 2019 Pan American Games
Pan American Games silver medalists for Canada
Ball State Cardinals softball players
Softball players at the 2020 Summer Olympics
Olympic softball players of Canada
Medalists at the 2020 Summer Olympics
Olympic bronze medalists for Canada
Olympic medalists in softball
Pan American Games medalists in softball